Three ships of the French Navy have borne the name De Grasse in honour of François Joseph Paul de Grasse: 

 , a requisitioned steamer
  (C610), an anti-aircraft cruiser (1946–1974)

See also
 , a French oceanliner
 

French Navy ship names